Juncalinho is a town in the eastern part of the island of São Nicolau, Cape Verde. It is situated on the north coast, 17 km east of Ribeira Brava. The local football club is FC Belo Horizonte.

See also
List of cities and towns in Cape Verde

References

Geography of São Nicolau, Cape Verde
Ribeira Brava, Cape Verde
Towns in Cape Verde